Hinshaw is a surname. Notable people with the surname include:

Ashley Hinshaw (born 1988), American actress and model
Alexander Omar Hinshaw (born 1982), American Major League Baseball
Andrew Jackson Hinshaw (born 1923)
Edmund Howard Hinshaw (1860–1932), Nebraska republican
Dr. Horton Corwin Hinshaw (1902-2000), Pioneer in the treatment of tuberculosis
Jerry E. Hinshaw (1917-2003), member of the Arkansas House of Representatives from 1981 to 1996
John Carl Hinshaw (1894–1956), United States Representative
Waldo Stephen Hinshaw (born 1940), Pioneer in the development of Magnetic Resonance Imaging (MRI) technology

See also
Hinshaw's, a department store chain in Southern California
Hinshaw Music, music publisher in Chapel Hill, North Carolina
Elias Hinshaw House